Jacob "Yaakov" Turkel (Hebrew: יעקב טירקל; born in 1935 in Tel Aviv) is an Israeli judge, and former Supreme Court of Israel Justice.

Turkel served as a judge for 38 years, a decade of that time on the Israeli Supreme Court. In June 2010, he was appointed to head the Israeli special independent Turkel Commission of Inquiry into the Gaza flotilla raid.

Biography

Yaakov Turkel was born in Tel Aviv to a family that had immigrated from Vienna, Austria, in 1933. At age five, the family moved to Jerusalem, where Turkel attended Ma'aleh, a state religious school. Turkel studied law at Hebrew University of Jerusalem, graduating from its law school in 1960.

Judicial career
From 1967 on, Turkel served on various courts, including the Shalom Court, as a Regional Court judge.  From 1980 to 1995 he served as President of the Beersheba District Court (during which time he took two years off to serve as an acting Supreme Court justice).

Turkel served as an Israeli Supreme Court Justice from 1995 until 2005.

In August 2000 he wrote in an opinion that by filling in gaps of missing text in a 2,000-year-old Dead Sea Scroll, and deciphering and putting together scroll fragments, a scholar had shown "originality and creativity" that gave him a copyright in his work.  In October 2000, he rejected an appeal by Holocaust survivors and the Simon Wiesenthal Center against the first Israeli performance of a work by German composer Richard Wagner, who Holocaust survivors and others say promoted anti-Semitism.

In June 2004, he issued a temporary injunction prohibiting the State of Israel from removing thousands of tons of earth and rubble mixed with assorted archaeologically rich artifacts lying on Jerusalem's Temple Mount. He still sits on a military court appeals panel.

Turkel was known during his tenure on the Supreme Court for writing a relatively large number of dissenting opinions, compared to his fellow Justices.  This accorded with the Supreme Court opinion in which he wrote about the right of the individual to "shout out [his own] truth", and the article he wrote in Mehkarei Mishpat (Bar-Ilan University Law Review) in which he said:  "The stand of the individual against an `overwhelming majority' is not a negligible matter."

Academic career
Turkel has taught at Ben Gurion University of the Negev, the University of Tel Aviv, the law school of Netanya Academic College, and other academic institutions.

Public commissions

Gay rights
He headed a public commission that was set up in 1999 to reform Israel's inheritance law. The commission proposed in 2006 that the law's definition of a couple be altered from "husband and wife", so that it would apply to both gay and heterosexual couples.  He also served as a member of the Committee of Judicial Appointments.

Other work
Turkel is also the current Chairman of the Award Committee, which administers The EMET Prize for Art, Science and Culture.

In June 2010, he was appointed by Israeli Prime Minister Benjamin Netanyahu to head the Israeli special independent commission of inquiry, referred to as the Turkel Commission, into the events in the flotilla in Gaza.

The Commission investigated whether Israel's actions in preventing the arrival of ships in Gaza were in accordance with international law.  It focused among other things on considering the security considerations for imposing a naval blockade on the Gaza Strip and the conformity of the naval blockade with the rules of international law; the conformity of the actions during the raid to principles of international law; and the actions taken by those who organized  and participated in the flotilla, and their identities.

Also on the Commission were former Technion University President Amos Horev and two other members, Miguel Deutch and Reuven Merchav, added in July 2010. Shabtai Rosenne, Bar Ilan University Professor of International Law, also served on the Commission from its establishment until his death on 21 September 2010.  In addition, the Commission had two foreign observers, former First Minister of Northern Ireland David Trimble, and former head of the Canadian military's judiciary, Judge Advocate General Ken Watkin, who took part in hearings and discussions, but did not vote on the final conclusions.

See also
Public Committee (Israel)

References

1935 births
Israeli people of Austrian-Jewish descent
Israeli Jews
Judges of the Supreme Court of Israel
Lawyers from Beersheba
Living people
Israeli commissions and inquiries
Hebrew University of Jerusalem Faculty of Law alumni
Academic staff of Ben-Gurion University of the Negev
Academic staff of Tel Aviv University
20th-century Israeli judges
21st-century Israeli judges